Leposoma is a genus of South American lizards in the family Gymnophthalmidae.

Species
The following six species are recognized as being valid:
Leposoma annectans 
Leposoma baturitensis 
Leposoma nanodactylus 
Leposoma puk 
Leposoma scincoides  - skink tegu
Leposoma sinepollex

References

Further reading
Spix JB (1825). Animalia nova sive species novae lacertarum, quas in itinere per Brasiliam annis MDCCCXVII – MDCCCXX jussu et auspiciis Miximiliani Josephi I. Bavariae Regis suscepto collegit et descripsit. Munich: F.S. Hübschmann. Index (four unnumbered pages) + 26 pp. + 30 color plates. (Leposoma, new genus, p. 24). (in Latin).

 
Reptiles of South America
Lizard genera
Taxa named by Johann Baptist von Spix